Piet Tekelenburg ( – ) was a Dutch footballer. He was part of the Netherlands national team, playing two matches. He played his first match on 9 June 1919.

Tekelenburg became a physician. Since 1927 he worked in the Dutch East Indies as a medical officer at the KNIL.

At the age of 50, he died in a Japanese internment camp and was buried in the Dutch War Cemetery at Leuwigajah in Cimahi, West Java.

See also
 List of Dutch international footballers

References

1894 births
1945 deaths
Dutch footballers
Association football defenders
Netherlands international footballers
HFC Haarlem players
Footballers from Haarlem
Dutch military personnel killed in World War II
Royal Netherlands East Indies Army personnel of World War II
World War II prisoners of war held by Japan
Dutch prisoners of war in World War II
Royal Netherlands East Indies Army officers
Burials in Java